Sparks is an album produced for the occasion of Roberto Paci Dalò's solo exhibition Sparks at the Palazzo delle Papesse, and presented during the opening on 6 October 2007.  It is the third release by 21st Records discography series founded by the Sienese centre and the label Horus Music.

Background
The project is named after the word sparks once used to define marconimen, marconists or radiotelegraphists, in the early years of the XX century. It’s a tribute to the pioneers of radio transmission in the Morse code era.
About the album, some materials are completely acoustic from recordings made within a ten-year time frame. 1 to 3, 5, 6, 8, are tracks once made in 1995 as part of the Rai program Audiobox. Shpil and Sparks recorded live at the Phonurgia Nova Festival in Arles, 1996. EMN40 as a multi-channel audio/video installation for the Ensemble Musique Nouvelles 40th anniversary, Bruxelles 2002. Yiddish lyrics of Gospel written by Chaim Tauber.

Reception

- Enzo Mansueto, Rodeo Magazine n°44 febbraio 2008 

- Pino Saulo 

- John Zorn

Track listing

Personnel

 Accordion – Claudio Jacomucci
 Cello – Tom Cora
 Clarinet, Bass Clarinet, Voice, Sampler, Composed By, Producer, Mastered By – Roberto Paci Dalò
 Drums – Fabrizio Spera
 Electric Guitar – Jean-Marc Montera
 Violin, Narrator [Japanese Narration] – Takumi Fukushima
 Engineer – Claudio Baldasseroni (tracks: 1 to 3, 5, 6, 8)
 Mastered By [Assistant] – Andrea Felli
 Photography By [Rimini Old Harbour] – Roberto Paci Dalò
 Photography By [Stalingrad Polaroid] – Patrizio Esposito
 Design – Michela Bracciali

References

2007 albums